Sunforest was the ninth album recorded by American singer-songwriter Tom Rapp (either with or without his group Pearls Before Swine), his second for Blue Thumb Records, and his final record before his lengthy retirement from the music industry after the mid-1970s.

Sunforest was released in 1973 and was credited to "Tom Rapp / Pearls Before Swine".  Like its immediate predecessor, Stardancer, the album was recorded with members of the touring group Pearls Before Swine (Art Ellis and Bill Rollins), supplemented by a selection of prominent Nashville session musicians.

The content of the album, which is not generally regarded as one of his best, is very varied, but generally more upbeat than most of Rapp's work, with the up-tempo "Comin' Back" and "Someplace To Belong" almost rating as pop songs.  "Love/Sex" is a riposte to Stephen Stills' "Love The One You're With", containing the line "Love will get you through times of no sex / Better than sex will get you through times of no love", while the title track "Sunforest" is an attempt at a traditional folk ballad.  "Forbidden City" and "Blind River" show some jazz influences.  "Sunshine & Charles" is one of Rapp's own favourite songs and contains the classic line: "She was 16 when she found Jesus / He was a Puerto Rican kid and he lived next door".

The sleeve design showed a cover painting of Rapp, and two small reproductions of paintings by Henri Rousseau were included on the back cover.

Sunforest was reissued on CD by Demon Records in 1998, and again by Lemon Records in the UK in 2009.

Track listing
All tracks composed by Tom Rapp
"Comin' Back" - 2:59 
"Prayers Of Action" - 3:05 
"Forbidden City" - 2:51 
"Love / Sex" - 4:04 
"Harding Street" - 3:40 
"Blind River" - 4:57 
"Someplace To Belong" - 2:53 
"Sunforest" - 6:19 
"Sunshine & Charles" - 4:55

Personnel
Tom Rapp - vocals, guitar
Art Ellis - flute, congas, vocals
Bill Rollins - cello
Steve McCord - guitar, musical advisor
Jim Colvard - Dobro, guitar
Charlie McCoy - bowed psaltery, harmonica, harp, organ
Buzz Cason - vocals
Diane Harris - vocals
Charles Cochran - piano, string arrangements
Buddy Spicher - electric viola, violin
David Briggs - piano
Mike Leech - bass, string arrangements
Farrell Morris - percussion
Bobby Wood - piano
Reggie Young - piano
Karl Himmel - drums, percussion
Bobby Thompson - Dobro, guitar, banjo
Kenny Buttrey - drums
Bob Dorough - piano
Bill Salter - bass
Warren Smith - marimba

Other credits
Recorded at House of Cash, Quadrafonic Sound, Woodland Sound Studios, and Electric Lady
Produced by Larry Butler and Peter H. Edmiston
Engineers : Charlie Bragg, Gene Eichelberger, Rex Collier, Dick Shapiro

References

External links
Lyrics to Sunforest
[  AMG review]
 Official site for Tom Rapp and Pearls Before Swine
 Fan site on MySpace

Tom Rapp albums
1973 albums
Blue Thumb Records albums
Albums produced by Larry Butler (producer)